Jack Meredith (born 14 August 1992) is a British hurdler. He won gold at the 2011 European Athletics Junior Championships in Tallinn, Estonia.

References

External links

1992 births
Living people
British male hurdlers